The 2022 Croatia Rally (also known as the Rally Croatia 2022) was a motor racing event for rally cars that was held over four days between 21 and 24 April 2022. It marked the 46th running of the Croatia Rally, and was the third round of the 2022 World Rally Championship, World Rally Championship-2 and World Rally Championship-3.

Sébastien Ogier and Julien Ingrassia were the defending rally winners. However, they did not complete to defend their title as Ogier undertook a partial program in 2022 and Ingrassia retired from the sport at the end of 2021 season. Mads Østberg and Torstein Eriksen were the defending rally winners in the WRC-2 category. Kajetan Kajetanowicz and Maciej Szczepaniak were the defending rally winners in the WRC-3 category, with the British crew of Jon Armstrong and Phil Hall were the defending title-holders in the junior class.

Kalle Rovanperä and Jonne Halttunen won a back-to-back victory. Their team, Toyota Gazoo Racing WRT, successfully defended their title. Yohan Rossel and Valentin Sarreaud won the World Rally Championship-2 category. Zoltán László and Tamás Kürti won the World Rally Championship-3 category, while the Finnish crew of the Lauri Joona and Mikael Korhonen won the junior class.

Background

Entry list
The following crews are set to enter into the rally. The event will be opened to crews competing in the World Rally Championship, its support categories, the World Rally Championship-2 and World Rally Championship-3, and privateer entries that are not registered to score points in any championship. Eleven crews were entered under Rally1 regulations, as are twenty-nine Rally2 crews in the World Rally Championship-2 and eleven Rally3 crews in the World Rally Championship-3.

Itinerary
All dates and times are CEST (UTC+2).

Report

WRC Rally1

Classification

Special stages

Championship standings

WRC-2 Rally2

Classification

Special stages

Championship standings

WRC-3 Rally3

Classification

Special stages

Championship standings

Notes

References

External links

  
 2022 Croatia Rally at eWRC-results.com
 2022 Croatia Rally at rally-maps.com 

2022 in Croatian sport
Croatia
April 2022 sports events in Croatia
2022